Sanna Kanerva (born 24 June 1974) is a Finnish retired ice hockey player. A member of the Finnish national ice hockey team during 1994 to 1999, she won a bronze medal at the 1999 IIHF Women's World Championship and a gold medal at the 1995 IIHF European Women Championship.

Kanerva played a twelve-season club career in the Naisten SM-sarja with the Porin Ässät Naiset (1989–1995), the Keravan Shakers (1995–1998), and the Espoo Blues Naiset (1998–2001).

References

External links 
 

Living people
Sportspeople from Oulu
Finnish women's ice hockey forwards
Keravan Shakers players
Espoo Blues Naiset players
Ässät Naiset players
1974 births